Enchodus (from  , 'spear' and   'tooth') is an extinct genus of aulopiform ray-finned fish related to lancetfish and lizardfish. Species of Enchodus flourished during the Late Cretaceous, and survived the Cretaceous–Paleogene extinction event, persisting into the late Eocene.

Taxonomy
Species of Enchodus are generally classified into two different clades, the North American and the Mediterranean. It has been proposed that this distinction is the result of several isolated events between the two populations over the Late Cretaceous.
{{cladogram|align=center|style=font-size:100%; line-height:100%;width:500px;|title=Enchodus|caption=Phylogeny of the genus with some species|cladogram=
{{clade
|1={{clade
 |label1=Enchodus
  |1={{clade
   |1=E. marchesettii
   |2={{clade
    |1={{clade
     |1=Parenchodus
     |2=E. brevis
     |3=E. lewesiensis
     }}
    |2=
}}}}}}}}}}

 Description Enchodus species were small to medium in size. One of the genus' most notable attributes are the large "fangs" at the front of the upper and lower jaws and on the palatine bones, leading to its misleading nickname among fossil hunters and paleoichthyologists, "the saber-toothed herring". These fangs, along with a long sleek body and large eyes, suggest Enchodus was a predatory species.

The largest-known species of Enchodus is E. petrosus, remains of which are common from the Niobrara Chalk, the Mooreville Chalk Formation, the Pierre Shale, and other geological formations deposited within the Western Interior Seaway and the Mississippi Embayment. Other species were considerably smaller, some like E. parvus were only some centimeters (a few inches) long.

Despite being a formidable predator, remains of Enchodus are commonly found among the stomach contents of larger predators, including sharks, other bony fish, mosasaurs, plesiosaurs and seabirds such as Baptornis advenus.

 Distribution Enchodus fossils have been found all over the world. In North America, Enchodus remains have been recovered from most US states with fossiliferous Late Cretaceous rocks, including Kansas, Nebraska, Colorado, Alabama, Mississippi, Georgia, Tennessee, Wyoming, Texas, California, North Carolina, and New Jersey. Fossils also have been found in the Aguja and El Doctor Formations of Mexico and the Ashville, Vermillion River and Dinosaur Park Formations, and Brown Bed Member of Canada. The taxon is also known from coeval strata in Africa, the Middle East, Europe, southwest Asia and the Tiupampan Santa Lucía Formation and Maastrichtian El Molino Formation of Bolivia and the Paraíba, Pernambuco and Sergipe states of Brazil.

 Gallery 

 References 

 Further reading 
  (1874): Review of the Vertebrata of the Cretaceous period found west of the Mississippi River. U. S. Geological Survey of the Territories, Bulletin 1(2): 3-48.
 
  (1988): A check list of North American Marine Cretaceous vertebrates including fresh water fishes. Occasional Paper of the Tyrrell Museum of Palaeontology'' #4.

External links 
 
 Introduction to Paleontology

Prehistoric ray-finned fish genera
Cretaceous bony fish
Paleocene fish
Eocene fish
Cretaceous–Paleogene boundary
Late Cretaceous genus first appearances
Eocene genus extinctions
Late Cretaceous fish of North America
Demopolis Chalk
Mooreville Chalk
Mesozoic fish of Europe
Eocene fish of Europe
Cretaceous Sweden
Fossils of Sweden
Prehistoric fish of South America
Tiupampan
Paleogene Bolivia
Cretaceous Bolivia
Fossils of Bolivia
Santa Lucía Formation
Cretaceous Brazil
Fossils of Brazil
Fossil taxa described in 1835
Taxa named by Louis Agassiz
Aulopiformes